Brasserie Jo was a Chicago restaurant that received a James Beard Foundation Award for Best New Restaurant in 1996. Jean Joho was the founding chef.  It closed in 2010 after being open for 15 years.

Joho opened a second branch of the restaurant in the South End of Boston in the Colonnade Hotel, in 1998.  That location closed in October 2018.  The menu focused on food from Alsace.

See also 

 James Beard Foundation Award: 1990s

References 

Defunct French restaurants in the United States
Defunct restaurants in Boston
Defunct restaurants in Chicago
James Beard Foundation Award winners
French restaurants in Illinois
French restaurants in Massachusetts